Alexander William Urban (July 16, 1917 – September 7, 2007) was an American football defensive end and a tight end in the National Football League who played for the Green Bay Packers.  Urban played collegiately at the University of South Carolina, and entered the NFL with the Green Bay Packers.  Urban played professionally in 1941, and after fighting in World War II, played 2 more seasons with the Packers before retiring.

References

External links

1917 births
2007 deaths
American football tight ends
American football defensive linemen
South Carolina Gamecocks football players
Green Bay Packers players
American military personnel of World War II
Players of American football from Pennsylvania